The Auster Avis was a four-seat light aircraft developed from the Auster Autocrat. It featured a redesigned fuselage incorporating four doors and a circular cross-section towards the tail, new undercarriage, and new wing flaps. It was planned in two versions, the Mk 1 for civil use, and the Mk 2 for military and air ambulance duties. However, only two prototypes were built, and Auster abandoned the project in favour of the Auster J-5 Autocar.

Specifications (Avis)

References

Further reading
 
 
 

Single-engined tractor aircraft
High-wing aircraft
1940s British civil utility aircraft
1940s British military utility aircraft
Auster aircraft